The Port Kennedy Bone Cave is a limestone cave in the Port Kennedy section of Valley Forge National Historical Park, Pennsylvania, USA.  The Bone Cave "contained one of the most important middle Pleistocene (Irvingtonian, approximately 750,000 years ago) fossil deposits in North America".

History 
The fossils in the cave were investigated by noted 19th-century palaeontologists Edward Drinker Cope, Henry C. Mercer, and Charles M. Wheatley.  Some of the fossils, such as an unnamed member of the beetle genus of Dicaelus are unique to this cave and have not been identified elsewhere.

The cave was originally discovered by limestone miners in the 19th century. It was later filled in with asbestos-bearing industrial refuse and the cave's location was lost. The village of Port Kennedy was largely demolished in the 1960s during construction of the U.S. Route 422 Expressway. The tract containing the cave became part of the Valley Forge National Historical Park in 1978.  In 2005, the National Park Service and geologists rediscovered the cave.

It has been rumored that the quarry near where the cave is located near holds a crashed locomotive, which was used in the shooting of a now lost silent film in 1915, The Valley of Lost Hope.

Remains found in the cave

Insects 
Numerous insect remains were found embedded in clay masses in the cave.

These included:

 Cychrus wheatleyi
 Cymindis aurora / punctulatus
 Dicaelus alutaceus
 Choeridium(?) ebeninum 
 Phanaeus antiquus
 Aphodius precursor
 Cicindela (2 sp)

Vertebrates 
Mastodon americanus remains were found.

Others included:

Megalonyx
 Megalonyx wheatleyi (sp. nov.) (2)
 Megalonyx jeffersonii (14)
 Megalonyx loxodon (sp. nov.)
 Megalonyx dissimilis
 Megalonyx sphenodon
 Megalonyx tortulus

Arvicola
 Arvicola sigmodus (sp. nov.) (2) 
 Arvicola speothen (sp. nov.)
 Arvicola tetradelta (sp. nov.)
 Arvicola didelta (sp. nov.) 
 Arvicola involuta (sp. nov.) 
 Arvicola hiatidens (sp. nov.) 

Mylodon
 Mylodon harlani

Sciurus
 Sciurus calycinus

Jaculus
 Jaculus hudsonius

Others
 Hesperomys
 Erethizon cloacinum (sp. nov.)
 Lepus sylvaticus
 Praotherium palatinum (sp. nov.) nomen dubium
 Vespertilio
 Arctodus pristinus ("Ursus pristinus")
 Tapirus americanus
 Tapirus haysii / copei
 Equus
 Bos
 Felis (poss Felis onca)
 Canis
 Meleagris altus / superbus

Notes

References

External links 
 

Caves of Pennsylvania
Landforms of Montgomery County, Pennsylvania
Upper Merion Township, Montgomery County, Pennsylvania
Valley Forge National Historical Park